Thun Sophea (born 1979) is a retired professional kickboxer from Svay Rieng, Cambodia. He is the 2006 Cambodian Television Network Traditional Khmer Kickboxing champion.

In 2011, Thun was the highest paid athlete (along with Chhunly Pagenburg) from Cambodia making US$30,000.

Thun Sophea is now a referee for pradal serey matches.  He is also now the head coach of the Ministry of National Defense boxing team.

See also
Pradal Serey
Kickboxing

References

External links
 Thun Sophea ready to show no sympathy...-Phnom Penh Post
 Thun Sophea beats Vouey Sothun purple...-Phnom Penh Post

Cambodian male kickboxers
Living people
1982 births
People from Svay Rieng province